Trade unionism is a powerful force in the politics, economy, and culture of Senegal, and was one of the earliest trades union movements to form in Francophone West Africa.

History of Trade unionism in Senegal
Senegal has a long history of Trade Union activism, and was one of  the first centers of the African trade union movement, with small unions forming under French colonial rule in the 1920s. During the 1930s Popular Front government of France, limited union legalisation was extended to French subjects in West Africa. Senegal was also the home to the Four Communes, the only areas of French West Africa to afford residents (Originaires) French citizenship.

In the year and a half after limited unionisation rights were granted to colonial subjects and residents of the Four Communes alike (from May to November 1937), 42 professional unions had been created in Senegal. This rapid development included the creation of an all-African trade union confederation for the Dakar area in 1938.

In 1947 railroad workers went on a several-month strike on the Dakar-Niger Railway to obtain the same rights as the French railwaymen.  The successful strike was celebrated as a turning point in the anti-colonial struggle by Senegalese writer Ousmane Sembène in his 1960 novel Les bouts de bois de Dieu.

Contemporary union movement
Senegal's fundamental labor legislation is based on the French overseas labor code of 1952, which provides for collective agreements between employers and trade unions, for the fixing of basic minimum wages by the government on recommendation of advisory committees. The code also provides for paid annual leave and for child allowances. The right to strike is recognized by law, and there are special labor courts.

The largest trade union organization is the National Confederation of Senegalese Workers, which since 1970 has been the official union affiliated with the ruling PS. Its major rival is the National Union of Autonomous Labor Unions of Senegal. The industrial workforce is almost totally unionized. Although the relative number of union members is small, they have considerable political power due to their control of vital segments of the economy.

The minimum working age is 16, when minors may work in apprenticeships. The prohibition of child labor is strictly enforced in the formal sector, but somewhat less so in the informal and traditional economies. The labor law provides for a workweek of 40 to 48 hours and minimum occupational and safety and health regulations. However, these labor regulations are not effectively enforced outside of the formal economy. The minimum wage was $0.37 in 2001.

Principal Trade Union and Confederations
Democratic Union of Senegalese Workers Union Démocratique des Travailleurs de Sénégal (UDTS)
National Confederation of Senegalese Workers  Confédération Nationale des Travailleurs du Sénégal (CNTS)
Dakar Dem Dikk Workers Democratic Union: Dakar Public Transit Workers, Union démocratique des travailleurs de Dakar Dem Dikk, (UDT-3D)
National Confederation of Senegalese Workers - Force of Change  Confédération Nationale des Travailleurs du Sénégal - Forces du Changemen (CNTS-FC)
National Union of Autonomous Trade Unions of Senegal  Union Nationale des Syndicats Autonomes de Sénégal (UNSAS)
Senegales Confederation of Free Unions Confédération des syndicats autonomes du Sénégal (CSA)
General Confederation of Office and Administrative Workers Confédération générale des syndicats de cadres et du personnel d'encadrement (COGES)
General Confederation of Senegalese Democratic Workers Confédérations générale des travailleurs démocratiques du Sénégal (CGTDS)
General Federation of Senegalese Workers - Tendency A  Fédération générale des travailleurs du Sénégal - Tendance A (FGTS)
General Federation of Senegalese Workers - Tendency B  Fédération générale des travailleurs du Sénégal - Tendance B (FGTS)
Union of Free Senegalese Workers  Union des travailleurs libres du Sénégal (UTLS)
Union of Senegalese Democratic Workers  Syndicat des travailleurs démocratique du Sénégal (STDS)

Historic unions
Senegalese Workers Union, Union Sénégalaise des Travailleurs  1962-64

References

Beyond the numbers game. Peter Hall-Jones, New Unionism 2007 Union Federation Membership Numbers Survey.
2007 Annual Survey of violations of trade union rights: Senegal, TUC-CSI-IGB
Guy Pfeffermann. Trade Unions and Politics in French West Africa during the Fourth Republic. African Affairs, Vol. 66, No. 264 (Jul., 1967), pp. 213–230.  Guy Pfeffermann is Founder & CEO of Global Business School Network
11. Senegal: Institutional Aspects of Trade and Industry Policy. Gaye Daffé and Momar Coumba Diop,  in  THE POLITICS OF TRADE AND INDUSTRIAL POLICY IN AFRICA: Forced Consensus? Edited by Charles Soludo, Osita Ogbu, and Ha-Joon Chang. Africa World Press/IDRC 2004  
  Internationally-recognised Core Labour Standards in Niger and Senegal: REPORT FOR THE WTO GENERAL COUNCIL REVIEW OF THE TRADE POLICIES OF NIGER AND SENEGAL (Geneva, 22-24 September 2003), International Confederation of Free Trade Unions.
 Senegal: Annual Survey of Violations of Trade Union Rights (2006), International Confederation of Free Trade Unions.
Portions of this article were translated from French Wikipedia's :fr:syndicalisme au Sénégal. (2008-06-13)

Further reading
 Nicole Bernard-Duquenet, « Les débuts du syndicalisme au Sénégal au temps du Front populaire », Le Mouvement social, n° 101, octobre-décembre 1977, p. 37-59
 Ibrahima Camara, Syndicalisme, colonialisme et impérialisme au Sénégal, 1972
  Adrien Dioh, Les syndicats de travailleurs au Sénégal, Paris ; Budapest ; Torino, L'Harmattan, 2002, 400 p.  
 Mar Fall, L'État et la question syndicale au Sénégal, Paris, L'Harmattan, 1989, 127 p.
 Omar Guèye, Le mouvement syndical au Sénégal pendant la deuxième guerre mondiale, Dakar, Université Cheikh Anta Diop, 1991, 43 p. (Mémoire de DEA)
 Magatte Lô, Sénégal : syndicalisme et participation responsible, L'Harmattan, 1987
 F. Mulot, « Syndicalisme et politique au Sénégal », Revue française d'études politiques africaines, 158, 1979, p. 63-90
 Birame Ndour, Éléments d'études sur le mouvement ouvrier dans les chemins de fer du Sénégal (1882–1938), Paris, Université de Paris VII, 1981, 67 p. (Diplôme d'Etudes Approfondies)
 E. H. I. Niang, Le rôle du syndicalisme dans le développement économique : le cas du Sénégal, Université Laval, 1987 (M.A.) 
 Luis C. Nunes, La Participation du syndicalisme à la construction nationale en Afrique : examples du Sénégal, Mali et Côte d'Ivoire, Genève,  Ed. Médecine et Hygiène, 1972
 Jean-Pierre Phan, Syndicalisme et mouvement de libération nationale au Sénégal jusqu'à l'indépendance, 1976
 Christian Roche, Le Sénégal à la conquête de son indépendance, 1939-1960. Chronique de la vie politique et syndicale, de l'Empire français à l'Indépendance, Paris, Karthala, 2001, 286 p. 
 Ousmane Kéba Sane, Le mouvement syndical enseignant au Sénégal : Du syndicat unique de l'enseignement laïc (S.U.E.L) au syndicat des enseignants du Sénégal (S.E.S), Dakar, Université Cheikh Anta Diop, 2002, 143 p. (Mémoire de Maîtrise)
 Djibril Alassane Sarr, L’UNTS : histoire d'une centrale syndicale (1962–1971), Dakar, Université de Dakar, 1986, 106 p. (Mémoire de Maîtrise)
 Ahmat Hadji Sidimi, Le mouvement ouvrier dans le chemin de fer 1917-1925. Genèse, évolution, Dakar, Université de Dakar, 1983, 126 p. + 4 p. (Mémoire de Maîtrise)
 Iba Der Thiam, L’évolution politique et syndicale du Sénégal colonial de 1840 à 1936, Paris, Université de Paris I, 1983, 9 vol., 5 179 p. (Thèse d'État)
  Adrien Dioh, Les syndicats de travailleurs au Sénégal, Paris ; Budapest ; Torino : L'Harmattan, 2002, 400 p.

External links
 Confédération Nationale des Travailleurs du Sénégal (CNTS)
 Solidarité Ouvrière: Senegal.  Senegalese news stories related to trade union militancy.
Cases Before the Committee on Freedom of Association: Senegal: International Labour Organization of the United Nations.

 
Economy of Senegal